Ludwik Denderys (born 26 April 1944) is a Polish boxer. He competed in the men's heavyweight event at the 1972 Summer Olympics but lost his opening bout to Teófilo Stevenson of Cuba. Danderys was born in what is now Western Ukraine and was affiliated with the Gwardia Wrocław boxing club.

References

1944 births
Living people
Polish male boxers
Olympic boxers of Poland
Boxers at the 1972 Summer Olympics
People from Ternopil Oblast
Sportspeople from Wrocław
Heavyweight boxers
20th-century Polish people
21st-century Polish people